Gail Brodsky was the defending champion, but lost in the second round to Katie Swan.

Ellen Perez won the title after her compatriot Zoe Hives retired in the final at 6–2, 3–2.

Seeds

Draw

Finals

Top half

Bottom half

References

Main Draw

Braidy Industries Women's Tennis Classic - Singles